Juan Padrón Acosta (October 20, 1892 – December 7, 1981) was an American Negro league and Cuban League pitcher in the 1910s and 1920s.

A native of Key West, Florida, Padrón spent over a decade in the Negro leagues, making his debut in 1915 with the Lincoln Giants, and finishing in 1926 with the Indianapolis ABCs. He also spent time in the Cuban League with the Almendares and Habana clubs. Padrón died in East Grand Rapids, Michigan in 1981 at age 89.

References

External links
 and Baseball-Reference Cuban and Black Baseball stats and Seamheads

1892 births
1981 deaths
Almendares (baseball) players
Birmingham Black Barons players
Brooklyn Royal Giants players
Chicago American Giants players
Cuban Stars (East) players
Cuban Stars (West) players
Habana players
Indianapolis ABCs players
Lincoln Giants players
American expatriate baseball players in Cuba
Baseball pitchers